Reynoldsia is a formerly recognised genus of plants in the ivy family, Araliaceae. In 2003, Kew Gardens published a checklist for Araliaceae, in which eight species were recognized for Reynoldsia: four from Samoa, two from Tahiti, one from the Marquesas, and one from Hawaii. In 2010, a phylogenetic comparison of DNA data showed that Reynoldsia was polyphyletic, consisting of two groups that are not each other's closest relatives. In a companion paper, three of the species were "sunk" into synonymy with others, reducing the number of species to five. All species that were formerly in Reynoldsia are now in Polyscias subgenus Tetraplasandra, a subgenus of 21 species indigenous to Malesia and the Pacific islands.

Reynoldsia was a genus of shrubs to medium-sized trees, mostly of dry habitats, especially the leeward sides of tropical Pacific islands. The leaves are imparipinnate, and alternate. The leaf margin is never completely entire, but varies from obscurely to patently dentate.

 considered Reynoldsia to be hard to distinguish from Tetraplasandra, another defunct genus to which it was closely related. In general, Reynoldsia can be recognized by its toothed leaflets, greater number of ovary cells, and smaller number of stamens.

Polyscias sandwicensis (formerly Reynoldsia sandwicensis) is cultivated, albeit rarely, in Hawaii. Instructions for its cultivation are available.

Species 
Eight species were listed by Frodin and Govaerts (2003) for Reynoldsia. Lowry and Plunkett (2010) recognized only five of these, and placed them in Polyscias subgenus Tetraplasandra. The synonyms given below are the species recognized by Frodin and Govaerts (2003).

 Polyscias lanutoensis  (= Reynoldsia lanutoensis, Reynoldsia grayana, Reynoldsia tauensis)
 Polyscias marchionensis  (= Reynoldsia marchionensis)
 Polyscias pleiosperma  (= Reynoldsia pleiosperma)
 Polyscias sandwicensis  (= Reynoldsia sandwicensis)
 Polyscias verrucosa  (= Reynoldsia verrucosa, Reynoldsia tahitiensis)

History 
The genus Reynoldsia was erected in 1854 by Asa Gray in his account of the botany of the United States Exploring Expedition (1838-1842). The genus was named for Jeremiah N. Reynolds, a plant collector in Chile in the early 19th century. Gray named two species: Reynoldsia pleiosperma from Samoa and Reynoldsia sandwicensis from Hawaii. John Hutchinson designated the latter as the type species for Reynoldsia in 1967. This is not recorded in Index Nominum Genericorum, where such information is usually found.

Berthold Carl Seemann named a Tahitian species, Reynoldsia verrucosa, in 1864. In 1873, :fr:Jean Nadeaud named another Tahitian species, Reynoldsia tahitensis. Many authors, such as Forest B. H. Brown, did not accept R. tahitensis as a separate species from R. verrucosa.

In 1925, Bénédict P.G. Hochreutiner named a second species from Samoa, Reynoldsia lanutoensis. In 1935, a third species from Samoa, Reynoldsia grayana was named by Erling Christophersen. Christophersen suggested that some plants from a place called Tau might be a fourth species of Reynoldsia in Samoa. Also in 1935, Reynoldsia marchionensis, a species from the Marquesas, was named by Forest B.H. Brown. The rare Samoan endemic, Reynoldsia tauensis, was finally published as a separate species in 1968 by Albert C. Smith and Benjamin Clemens Stone.

Some sources state that there are two species of Reynoldsia in the Society Islands, and this error has been copied from one source to another. An examination of the references cited here shows that R. marchionensis is the only species name in Reynoldsia that was ever published for a plant from the Society Islands.

Earl Edward Sherff believed that there were eight species of Reynoldsia in Hawaii. In 1952, he published names for these, as well as descriptions and an identification key. Subsequent authors have regarded these names as merely regional variants or forms of Reynoldsia sandwicensis.

In 2003, a checklist and nomenclator was published for Araliaceae. Eight species were recognized therein. The authors stated that Reynoldsia is "seen as biphyletic". The biphyly of Reynoldsia was confirmed in 2007, in a molecular phylogenetic study of what is now called Polyscias subgenus Tetraplasandra. It was confirmed again, in 2010, in a study of DNA sequences of selected genes in the pinnate genera of Araliaceae.

In an accompanying paper in Plant Diversity and Evolution, all of the pinnate Araliaceae were placed in the large genus Polyscias, thus raising the number of species in that genus from about 100 to 159, not counting about 90 species that will be published in forthcoming papers. Six of the genera that were recognized in the 2003 checklist (Arthrophyllum, Cuphocarpus, Gastonia, Reynoldsia, Munroidendron, and Tetraplasandra) were subsumed into Polyscias.

Polyscias was then divided into 11 subgenera (Polyscias, Grotefendia, Maralia, Arthrophyllum, Cuphocarpus, Tetraplasandra, Eupteron, Sciadopanax, Tieghemopanax, Indokingia, and Palmervandenbroekia) and 7 species (Polyscias acuminata, Polyscias macdowallii, Polyscias mollis, Polyscias murrayi, Polyscias ledermannii, Polyscias pentamera, and Polyscias purpurea) were placed in Polyscias incertae sedis (not in any subgroup thereof). All of the species of the former Reynoldsia are now in Polyscias subgenus Tetraplasandra.

This subgenus consists of the four south Pacific species that were in Reynoldsia, four of the six species that Philipson had placed in Polyscias section Eupteron, the two Malesian species that had been in Gastonia, and a Hawaiian clade of 11 species. The Hawaiian clade consists of the sister species Polyscias sandwicensis (formerly Reynoldsia sandwicensis) and Polyscias racemosa (formerly Munroidendron racemosum), as well as a monophyletic group of nine species that had been in Tetraplasandra as defined by Philipson in 1970.

When Polyscias was recircumscribed in 2010, the authors did not recognize all of the eight species that had been recognized in 2003. They placed R. grayana and R. tauensis into synonymy under R. lanutoensis. They likewise subsumed R. tahitiensis into R. verrucosa. The resulting five species were transferred to Polyscias as P. lanutoensis, P. pleiosperma, P. marchionensis, P. verrucosa, and P. sandwicensis.

References

Sources 
Gregory M. Plunkett, Jun Wen, Porter P. Lowry II, Murray J. Henwood, Pedro Fiaschi, and Anthony D. Mitchell. accepted, undated. Araliaceae, pages ??. In: Klaus Kubitzki (editor); ?? (volume editor). The Families and Genera of Vascular Plants volume ??. Springer-Verlag: Berlin; Heidelberg, Germany. ISBN ??

External links 
 World Checklist and Bibliography of Araliaceae  World Checklists  kewbooks  Scientific Publications  Kew Gardens
 Lowry & Plunkett.2010  Hawaii Barcoding  University of Hawaii at Hilo
 Reynoldsia  Plant Names  IPNI
 Reynoldsia, page 723  View Book  Botany. Phanerogamia.  Gray, Asa, 1810-1888  G  Authors  BHL
 CRC World Dictionary of Plant Names: R-Z  Botany & Plant Science  Life Science  CRC Press
 Reynoldsia  Index Nominum Genericorum  References  NMNH Department of Botany  Research and Collections  Smithsonian National Museum of Natural History
 Reynoldsia verrucosa  Revision of the natural order Hederaceae, pages 235-309  View Book  Journal of botany, British and foreign volume 2 (1864)  J  Titles  Biodiversity Heritage Library
 Reynoldsia tahitensis, page 63  Full View  Enumération des plantes indigènes de l'île de Tahiti recueillies et classées / par J. Nadeaud.  The Online Books Page (beginning with "Nadeaud")  The Online Books Page  University of Pennsylvania Libraries
 Reynoldsia tauensis, page 465  View Book  Journal of the Arnold Arboretum vol. 49 (1968)  J  Titles  BHL
 Reynoldsia  Mabberley's Plant-Book
 Flora Malesiana home page
 Reynoldsia (Search Exact) At: Names At: Tropicos At: Science and Conservation At: Missouri Botanical Garden
 Reynoldsia At: List of Genera At: Araliaceae At: List of families At: Families and Genera in GRIN At: Queries At: GRIN taxonomy for plants
 subgenus Tetraplasandra  Polyscias  Araliaceae  Apiineae  Apiales In: ··· Embryophyta At: Streptophytina At: Streptophyta At: Viridiplantae At: Eukaryota At: Taxonomy At: UniProt
 Polyscias sandwicensis  Polyscias  Araliaceae  Apiales  Asteranae  Magnoliopsida  Angiospermae  Hierarchy List for Kingdom Plantae from Kingdom to Class  Hierarchical Report  Data Access and Tools  ITIS
 Reynoldsia sandwicensis  Common Forest Trees of Hawaii  Trees for Hawaii Forestry  Forestry Extension  Extension and Outreach  NREM  Departments and Units  CTAHR  Colleges & Schools  Academics  UH Manoa
 Reynoldsia sandwicensis (ohe makai)  List by Scientific Name  Hawaiian Ethnobotany Online Database  Searchable Databases  Bishop Museum
 Polyscias sandwicensis  Araliacee  Family Index  Plants of Hawaii  Starr Environmental  Hawaiian Ecosystems at Risk

Historically recognized angiosperm genera
Araliaceae
Apiales genera
Polyscias